Porto and its metropolitan area feature a Mediterranean climate (Köppen: Csb) with mild wet winters and warm dry summers. According to the Troll-Paffen climate classification, Porto has a warm-temperate subtropical climate (Warmgemäßigt-subtropisches Zonenklima), and a subtropical climate according to Siegmund/Frankenberg. Porto is the wettest major city with a Mediterranean climate.

Classifications

Temperature

Normals

Porto has generally moderate temperatures.

Extremes
Due to its coastal position, temperatures below freezing are rare, and frosts are never severe. Porto is placed in the USDA hardiness zone 10a.

Precipitation
Porto has abundant levels of precipitation. Despite averaging above  of precipitation a year, July and August are relatively dry with around  falling each month. The wettest period is between October and February, mostly between October and December, the wettest month.

Humidity
The average relative humidity is around 77%. 81% from November to January and 73% in the summer. Summer can be slightly muggy in the hottest days but is generally comfortable, as temperatures rarelly surpass .

Other phenomena

Sunshine, UV and daylight
Despite its precipitation, the total hours of sunshine are relatively normal for a region of its latitude. Winters, especially December, are somewhat dull, and summers are sunny.

Wind
As a coastal Atlantic city, winds are most predominant in winter. In the summer, nortada winds prevail and can refresh the city in the hottest days. The city centre is sheltered and seldom gets any strong winds.

Sea Temperature

1961-1990 data

References

External links
 

Porto
Porto